The 2020–21 Philadelphia Flyers season was the 54th season for the National Hockey League franchise that was established on June 5, 1967. This was also the second season with head coach Alain Vigneault. On December 20, 2020, the league temporarily realigned into four divisions with no conferences due to the COVID-19 pandemic and the ongoing closure of the Canada–United States border. As a result of this realignment, the Flyers played this season in the East Division and played against only the other teams in their new division during the regular season.

On April 29, 2021, the Flyers were eliminated from playoff contention, with a 5–3 loss to the New Jersey Devils.

Standings

Divisional standings

Schedule and results

Regular season
The regular season schedule was published on December 23, 2020.

Player statistics

Skaters

Goaltenders

†Denotes player spent time with another team before joining the Flyers. Stats reflect time with the Flyers only.
‡Denotes player was traded mid-season. Stats reflect time with the Flyers only.
Bold/italics denotes franchise record.

Awards and records

Awards

Records

Among the team records set during the 2020–21 season was the Flyers giving up seven goals during the second period against the New York Rangers on March 17.

Transactions
The Flyers were involved in the following transactions during the 2020–21 season.

Trades

Players acquired

Players lost

Signings

Draft picks

Below are the Philadelphia Flyers' selections at the 2020 NHL Entry Draft, which was originally scheduled for June 26–27, 2020 at the Bell Center in Montreal, Quebec, but was postponed on March 25, 2020, due to the COVID-19 pandemic. It was held October 6–7, 2020 virtually via Video conference call from the NHL Network studio in Secaucus, New Jersey.

Notes

References
General
 
 
 

Specific

Philadelphia Flyers seasons
Flyers
2020 in sports in Pennsylvania
2021 in sports in Pennsylvania